A Hot tub is a small, manufactured pool or tub filled with hot water and used for relaxation, massage, or hydrotherapy.

Hot tub may also refer to:
Hot Tub (Drawn Together episode)
Hot Tub, an episode from the fifth season of Malcolm in the Middle
The Hot Tub (Seinfeld episode)
Hot Tub with Kurt and Kristen, a weekly comedy variety show 
Hot Tub Time Machine, a 2010 comedy film

See also